The 1972–73 NCAA University Division men's ice hockey season began in November 1972 and concluded with the 1973 NCAA University Division Men's Ice Hockey Tournament's championship game on March 17, 1973 at the Boston Garden in Boston, Massachusetts. This was the 26th season in which an NCAA ice hockey championship was held and is the 79th year overall where an NCAA school fielded a team.

After the season Denver's participation in the NCAA tournament was vacated due to violations of NCAA regulations.

After the season Army was classified as a Division II squad as part of the NCAA's numerical classification system.

Lake Superior State began to sponsor their ice hockey program and the team was promptly admitted into the CCHA.

Regular season

Season tournaments

†Boston University won the tournament but was forced to forfeit each of the three games played after the conclusion of the season.

Standings

1973 NCAA Tournament

Note: * denotes overtime period(s)Note: † Denver's participation was later vacated due to NCAA violations

Player stats

Scoring leaders
The following players led the league in points at the conclusion of the season.

GP = Games played; G = Goals; A = Assists; Pts = Points; PIM = Penalty minutes

Leading goaltenders
The following goaltenders led the league in goals against average at the end of the regular season while playing at least 33% of their team's total minutes.

GP = Games played; Min = Minutes played; W = Wins; L = Losses; OT = Overtime/shootout losses; GA = Goals against; SO = Shutouts; SV% = Save percentage; GAA = Goals against average

Awards

NCAA

CCHA

ECAC

WCHA

See also
 1972–73 NCAA College Division men's ice hockey season

References

External links
College Hockey Historical Archives
1972–73 NCAA Standings

 
NCAA